The Budhi Gandaki Hydroelectric Project is a proposed hydroelectric power plant in Nepal, to be developed by Nepal Electricity Authority (NEA).

This storage hydropower plant is to be located on the Budhi Gandaki River, approximately 2 km upstream of its confluence with Trishuli River, about 55 km west of Kathmandu (80 km by road).

With its planned installed capacity of 1,200 MW, it is the largest hydropower project in Nepal (before 900 MW Upper Karnali and Arun III projects), being sometimes considered a national pride. The 225 meters high dam will also be one of the highest in the country.

Aside from the dam, a 225 km long ring road will be built all around the future reservoir, which may also serve as a tourist attraction.

≤≤≤≤≤== Timeline ==≥≥≥≥≥
The site has been identified as early as in the late 1970s. A pre-feasibility study was carried out in 1984, and a first feasibility study in 1998. Additional studies conducted by the NEA in 2010–2011 in order to optimize hydropower potential use on the site led to the current proposal.

As of May 2019, the resettlement process was ongoing, with Rs20 billion already spent in land acquisition in both concerned districts, and another Rs18 billion set aside to complete compensation by the next fiscal year. In the meanwhile, Finance Misistry started to raise concerns over the total cost of the project.

In June 2019, the 635 MW Dudh Koshi Hydroelectric Project was favoured by NEA to Budi Gandaki HPP, due to its lower social impact ("only" 162 households severely impacted), lower cost ($1.5 billion), slightly higher and substantially more steady power output, thanks to its feeding by Mount Everest snowmelt during the dry season. Conversely, Budhi Gandaki HPP, which used to be considered "top priority", was compromised by its massive cost and uncertainty related to population relocation. As a result, financing and construction of the latter might not occur during the next few years.

As of November 2019, a total Rs 37 billion ($300 million) had been raised for the project, mostly via an infrastructure tax on petroleum products imports. This tax allows to collect an estimated Rs1billion per month. The government targets to achieve the compensation process by mid-July 2020.

Social and environmental concerns 
The 49.8 km2 large, 45 km long reservoir generated by the dam is expected to displace 45,000 people. Those residents are to be relocated to a dedicated 785 hectares area.

References

Proposed hydroelectric power stations
Hydroelectric power stations in Nepal
Proposed renewable energy power stations in Nepal
National Pride Projects
Buildings and structures in Dhading District
Buildings and structures in Gorkha District